Francis Russell Nixon (August 18037 April 1879) was a British Anglican bishop who served as the first Bishop of Tasmania, Australia.

Early life and ministry
Nixon was the son of Robert Nixon, a priest and amateur painter of North Cray, Kent.  Nixon was educated at the Merchant Taylors school and St John's College, Oxford, graduating Bachelor of Arts (BA) and subsequently Oxford Master of Arts (MA) and Doctor of Divinity (DD). He was ordained priest in 1827 (the year of his graduation), becoming chaplain at Naples and afterwards held the perpetual curacies of Sandgate and Sandwich. While addressing a public meeting at Canterbury, his eloquence brought him to the notice of William Howley, Archbishop of Canterbury, who appointed him one of the Six Preachers at Canterbury Cathedral. In September 1840 he preached a sermon in the presence of the archbishop, which was published with notes in the same year.

Bishop of Tasmania

On 24 August 1842, Nixon was consecrated a bishop at Westminster Abbey, to serve as the first Bishop of Tasmania, and arrived in the colony (then still called Van Diemen's Land) in June 1843. His first task was the organisation of the church in Tasmania, and being a moderate high churchman he came into conflict with some clergy of evangelical views. His Lectures, Historical, Doctrinal, and Practical on the Catechism of the Church of England, a volume of over 600 pages, was published in London in 1843, and a second edition was called for in the following year. His letters patent declared his jurisdiction "spiritual and ecclesiastical throughout the diocese according to the ecclesiastical laws of England". Endeavouring to act on his letters of appointment, he came into conflict with the governor, John Eardley-Wilmot, and the Presbyterian and other denominations petitioned Queen Victoria on the subject.

Nixon's administration of the Diocese of Tasmania was firm and energetic, and he set a good example to the colonists by devoting a large proportion of his own income to the needs of the church and education. In 1847, he addressed a vigorous communication Henry Grey, 3rd Earl Grey on the evils of transportation, which was printed by order of the House of Commons in that year. It was also privately printed and issued at Launceston in November 1848. In addition to the works already mentioned Nixon published a short History of Merchant-Taylors' School in 1823, The Cruise of the Beacon, A Narrative of a Visit to the Islands in Bass's Straits (1857), and some charges and sermons. Like his father he practised painting, his sketchbook containing drawings and paintings of Tasmanian scenes is at the Mitchell Library, Sydney.

He resigned on account of ill health in March 1863, and was given a valuable living at Bolton Percy, Yorkshire, England; but finding his health would not allow him to give proper attention to his duties he resigned it in 1865, and went to live near Lake Maggiore in Italy. He died at his residence there on 7 April 1879.

References

External links
The Cruise of the Beacon, by Francis Nixon Russell
Bibliographic directory of material by Nixon from Project Canterbury

1803 births
1879 deaths
Anglican bishops of Tasmania
Alumni of St John's College, Oxford
19th-century Australian historians
Australian Anglican bishops